Teatulia is a privately owned tea company based in Denver, Colorado. Teatulia is named after the Tetulia region in Northern Bangladesh where the company grows and produces its teas. It is the first USDA-certified organic tea garden in Bangladesh and the first tea in the United States that is imported from Bangladesh.

History 

In 2000, the Ahmed family of Bangladesh purchased 2,000 acres of land in the Tetulia region, located against the Himalayas to the north and the Brahmaputra and Ganges rivers to the south. The family hoped the Kazi & Kazi Tea Estate, Ltd. (KKTE) would give the struggling economy a boost by providing area residents with jobs. Planting for the tea garden began on August 6, 2000. After several years of cultivation, Teatulia began to grow organic teas and herbs in its garden. Tea was introduced in the United States in 2005.

The tea garden's foundation is based on Japanese farmer Masanobu Fukuoka's natural farming method, where no machinery, chemicals, or artificial irrigation are used. For example, naturally growing plants and trees in the region, such as the neem tree (Azadirachta indica), help protect the Camellia sinensis tea plants from insects and pests. The tea is grown in Teatulia's garden in Bangladesh, handpicked by local tea pluckers, processed in onsite facilities, and then shipped directly to consumers around the world.

Corporate practices

Sustainability 

Teatulia packages its tea in what they call eco-canisters, made from 100 percent recyclable paper. Their eco-canisters are wrapped with labels printed with water-based inks, and their tea bags are made from a compostable corn silk. The outer wrapper of the individually wrapped tea bags is made from compostable eucalyptus and aspen leaf. Teatulia's merchandise, including tea chests and point-of-purchase displays, is made from reclaimed pinewood damaged by the mountain pine beetle.

Teatulia's teas were certified kosher through Star-K in 2013. 

In 2013, Teatulia received the Rainforest Alliance certification. The Rainforest Alliance is an international nonprofit organization, founded in 1987, that works to conserve biodiversity, develop and promote standards for sustainability, and foster the rights and welfare of workers, their families, and communities in more than 70 countries. Farms are audited against the Sustainable Agricultural Network's standards, and if they meet the criteria for responsible management, they are awarded the Rainforest Alliance Certified™ seal of approval. Farms that achieve Rainforest Alliance certification support a healthy environment, ensuring ecosystem conservation, wildlife protection, water and soil conservation, and agrochemical reduction. These farms also guarantee worker rights and safety, decent housing, legal wages and contracts for workers, and access to healthcare and education. In 2014, Teatulia became the first Colorado tea company certified as a B Corporation (B Corp) by B Lab, a nonprofit organization that uses the power of business to solve social and environmental problems. Certified B Corporations must meet standards of social and environmental performance and are legally required to consider the impact of their decisions not only on their shareholders, but also on their stakeholders (e.g., the community, the environment, workers, suppliers, and consumers).

Teatulia Cooperative 

Teatulia, known as Kazi & Kazi in Bangladesh, employs an average of 600 full-time workers and another 100 to 400 part-time workers at different times of the year.

Teatulia was the first large commercial enterprise of any kind to start operating in Tetulia. As a way to give back to the local community, the Teatulia Cooperative established education, health, and cattle-lending programs.

In the cattle-lending program, local women are given cattle by the cooperative as a loan. The loan is paid back through the dung of the cattle to be used as fertilizer in the garden. When the loan has been fully paid back, the families are allowed to keep the cattle and start over with the program if they like. 

The Teatulia Cooperative also offers literacy classes taught by graduate students. A computer lab was opened to initiate IT education in the community and a library is being built in Bangladesh to support the community. Teatulia reports that in 2013, 84 percent of male and female workers were literate. When the tea garden first opened, less than 30 percent of workers were literate.

The cooperative also provides medicinal shots and herbs to the neighboring villages in order to maintain the health of the community. Latrines are also distributed and maintained free of charge.

The cooperative provides footballs, volleyballs, and cricket bats free of cost to primary and secondary schools and local clubs.

Product line 

Orthodox tea: Teatulia practices the orthodox method of tea processing and offers ten whole leaf tea varieties in its orthodox line. Teatulia's whole leaf teas can be separated into four categories: white tea, green tea, black tea, and herbal tea. Teatulia's white, green, and black teas all come from the same Camellia sinensis tea plant. The way each tea is processed gives it a unique flavor profile and distinguishes whether it will become a white, green, or black tea.

White tea: Teatulia's white tea comes from the youngest and rarest part of the plant, which gives it a delicate flavor. White tea is neither rolled nor fired, so it is essentially non-oxidized and is the least processed. Instead of being exposed to artificial heat, the leaves are allowed to wither and dry in a carefully controlled environment.

Green tea: Teatulia's green tea is passed through a steaming treatment before rolling. Steaming applies light heat to the leaves to help stop the oxidation process before the leaves are rolled into shape. Steaming also helps bring out the fresh, grassy flavor of the leaf. Green tea leaves are not allowed to oxidize after rolling, which is why they remain light in color and flavor. Teatulia's line of whole leaf green tea includes two varieties: green and ginger green.

Black tea: Teatulia's black tea is immediately rolled after withering to assist in starting the oxidation processes. The leaves are then fully oxidized before they are dried, which is how they get their dark color and rich flavor. Teatulia's line of whole leaf black tea includes five varieties: black, breakfast tea, Earl Grey, Neem Nectar, and Tulsi Infusion.

Oolong tea: In September 2014, Teatulia launched its newest variety of tea, oolong. Oxidation levels in oolong can vary from 8% to 80% depending on the production style of the tea master, which is why the flavor profile of some oolongs may lean more toward a fresh green tea (less oxidized) and others toward a malty black tea (more oxidized). Oolong teas are traditionally rolled, twisted, or curled into tight balls or thin strands. Rolling is an important aspect of oolong processing that alters the appearance, color, and aroma of the final tea leaves. Depending on how and when the leaves are rolled during processing, the tea master can subtly alter the entire direction of the tea's final flavor.

Herbal tea: Teatulia's herbal infusions are not considered true teas because they do not come from the Camellia sinensis plant; they are a blend of other plants, herbs, and leaves grown in Teatulia's garden. Teatulia has three varieties in its line of herbal teas: peppermint, ginger, chamomile, and lemongrass.

Fine-cut teas: In May 2013, Teatulia launched a line of organic, fine-cut teas. They are a blend of tea from Teatulia's garden as well as other organic, like-minded tea farms. The tea leaves are finely ground instead of the whole leaves. Teatulia has five varieties of fine-cut teas: black, Earl Grey, green, jasmine green, chamomile and lemongrass.

Iced tea: Teatulia's line of iced teas are blended with fine-cut teas and herbs that are grown in Teatulia's garden as well as other like-minded tea gardens, and are packaged in one-ounce portion packs that brew one gallon of iced tea. Teatulia has four varieties of iced teas: signature black, ginger green, pomegranate green, and hibiscus berry.

Energy tea: Teatulia'a newest line of tea launched in 2015 is the Energy Tea including Energy Red, Energy Black, and Energy Green teas. The Energy Teas combine Teatulia's award-winning teas with the ancient, energizing herb eleuthero root, also known as Siberian ginseng, to create a tea meant to clear the mind while helping one embrace an busy, active lifestyle. Used for thousands of years in traditional Chinese medicine, Siberian ginseng has been known to help the body adapt to stressful conditions, recover faster, and overall perform optimally.

Awards

Teatulia has received the following industry and product awards.

 2011: Teatulia's Lemongrass Herbal Infusion was a sofiTM silver finalist for Outstanding Hot Beverage awarded by the Specialty Food Association.
 2011: Teatulia's Lemongrass Herbal Infusion won 2nd place in the North American Tea Championship (NATC), a division of World Tea Media, for Unflavored Herbal Tea.
 2011: Teatulia was awarded the Highest Sustainability Status from the New York International Gift Fair.
 2012: Teatulia was honored by Naturally Boulder with the Focus on the Future Award for its practices in sustainability.
 2012: The NATC awarded Teatulia's Lemongrass Herbal Infusion with 1st place in the Unflavored Herbal Tea category.
 2013: Teatulia received the 1st place honor for its Hibiscus Tea at the 2013 NATC for Best Herbal Iced Tea.
 2014: Teatulia's Black Tea won 2nd place in the North American Tea Championship (NATC), a division of World Tea Media, for Black Tea - Single Origin.
2014: Teatulia's Oolong won 3rd place in the North American Tea Championship (NATC), a division of World Tea Media, for Oolong Tea.
2014: Teatulia's White Tea won 3rd place in the North American Tea Championship (NATC), a division of World Tea Media, for White Tea.

References 

 Companies based in Denver
 Tea companies of the United States
 Kosher drinks
 Food and drink companies based in Colorado
 Certified B Corporations in the Food & Beverage Industry